Dhanera railway station is a railway station in Banaskantha district, Gujarat, India on the Western line of the North Western Railway network. DEMU, Express and Superfast trains halt here.

Trains

The following trains halt at Dhanera railway station in both directions:

 22483/84 Gandhidham–Jodhpur Express
 14805/06 Yesvantpur–Barmer AC Express
 14803/04 Bhagat Ki Kothi–Ahmedabad Weekly Express
 12489/90 Bikaner–Dadar Superfast Express
 14817/18 Bhagat Ki Kothi–Bandra Terminus Express (via Bhildi)

References 

Railway stations in Banaskantha district
Jodhpur railway division